Willie Louis Richardson (November 17, 1939 – February 8, 2016) was an American professional football wide receiver who played in the National Football League. He played nine seasons with the Baltimore Colts (1963–1969, 1971) and the Miami Dolphins (1970). He was named 1st Team All-Pro by the Associated Press for the 1967 NFL season and went to two Pro Bowls. After losing his starting role to Ray Perkins, he was traded along with a 1971 fourth-round selection (104th overall–Dwight White) from the Colts to the Pittsburgh Steelers for Roy Jefferson in an exchange of receivers who had fallen out of favor with their old teams on August 20, 1970.

Richardson was an All-American at Jackson State and in 2003 he was inducted into the College Football Hall of Fame.

He is the older brother of former NFL wide receiver Gloster Richardson, who played for the Kansas City Chiefs, the Dallas Cowboys and the Cleveland Browns. He died on February 8, 2016, at the age of 76.

References

1939 births
2016 deaths
Sportspeople from Clarksdale, Mississippi
Players of American football from Mississippi
American football wide receivers
Jackson State Tigers football players
College Football Hall of Fame inductees
Baltimore Colts players
Miami Dolphins players
Western Conference Pro Bowl players